Markus Lotter (born 28 September 1970) is a German football coach and a former player. He spent one season in the Bundesliga with FC St. Pauli.

At the moment, he lives in Berlin and works as a journalist.

References

1970 births
Living people
Association football midfielders
German footballers
German football managers
SpVgg Greuther Fürth players
FC St. Pauli players
Bundesliga players
2. Bundesliga players
People from Amberg
Sportspeople from the Upper Palatinate
Footballers from Bavaria